Vincent G. Danz was a New York Police Department officer and a Port Security Specialist Second Class in the United States Coast Guard Reserve, who died responding to the terrorist attacks on the World Trade Center, on September 11, 2001.

Police career

Danz joined the Police Department after serving in the United States Marine Corps.  He had been a Police officer for 14 years.  He started on bicycle patrol.  He was a member of the Emergency Services Unit.

Legacy

Danz was the first Police Officer to have a memorial service.  New York City Mayor Rudy Giuliani gave a eulogy.

In 2010, Charles "Skip" W. Bowen, who was then the Coast Guard's most senior non-commissioned officer, proposed that all the cutters in the Sentinel class should be named after enlisted sailors in the Coast Guard, or one of its precursor services, who were recognized for their heroism.  On October 23, 2019, the Coast Guard announced that the 62nd Sentinel class cutter would be named the USCGC Vincent Danz.

On November 12, 2019, Karl Schultz, Commandant of the Coast Guard was joined by Bill de Blasio, Mayor of New York, James P. O'Neill, Police Commissioner and John Sudnik FDNY Fire Chief, to formally announce the ship's names.

References

2001 deaths
Emergency workers killed in the September 11 attacks
United States Coast Guard non-commissioned officers
United States Coast Guard reservists
United States Marines
New York City Police Department officers